The following is a list of well-known algorithms along with one-line descriptions for each.

Automated planning

Combinatorial algorithms

General combinatorial algorithms
 Brent's algorithm: finds a cycle in function value iterations using only two iterators
 Floyd's cycle-finding algorithm: finds a cycle in function value iterations
 Gale–Shapley algorithm: solves the stable marriage problem
 Pseudorandom number generators (uniformly distributed—see also List of pseudorandom number generators for other PRNGs with varying degrees of convergence and varying statistical quality):
 ACORN generator
 Blum Blum Shub
 Lagged Fibonacci generator
 Linear congruential generator
 Mersenne Twister

Graph algorithms

 Coloring algorithm: Graph coloring algorithm.
 Hopcroft–Karp algorithm: convert a bipartite graph to a maximum cardinality matching
 Hungarian algorithm: algorithm for finding a perfect matching
 Prüfer coding: conversion between a labeled tree and its Prüfer sequence
 Tarjan's off-line lowest common ancestors algorithm: computes lowest common ancestors for pairs of nodes in a tree
 Topological sort: finds linear order of nodes (e.g. jobs) based on their dependencies.

Graph drawing

 Force-based algorithms (also known as force-directed algorithms or spring-based algorithm)
 Spectral layout

Network theory

 Network analysis
 Link analysis
 Girvan–Newman algorithm: detect communities in complex systems
 Web link analysis
 Hyperlink-Induced Topic Search (HITS) (also known as Hubs and authorities)
 PageRank
 TrustRank
 Flow networks
 Dinic's algorithm: is a strongly polynomial algorithm for computing the maximum flow in a flow network.
 Edmonds–Karp algorithm: implementation of Ford–Fulkerson
 Ford–Fulkerson algorithm: computes the maximum flow in a graph
 Karger's algorithm: a Monte Carlo method to compute the minimum cut of a connected graph
 Push–relabel algorithm: computes a maximum flow in a graph

Routing for graphs
 Edmonds' algorithm (also known as Chu–Liu/Edmonds' algorithm): find maximum or minimum branchings
 Euclidean minimum spanning tree: algorithms for computing the minimum spanning tree of a set of points in the plane
 Longest path problem: find a simple path of maximum length in a given graph
 Minimum spanning tree
 Borůvka's algorithm
 Kruskal's algorithm
 Prim's algorithm
 Reverse-delete algorithm
 Nonblocking minimal spanning switch say, for a telephone exchange
 Shortest path problem
 Bellman–Ford algorithm: computes shortest paths in a weighted graph (where some of the edge weights may be negative)
 Dijkstra's algorithm: computes shortest paths in a graph with non-negative edge weights
 Floyd–Warshall algorithm: solves the all pairs shortest path problem in a weighted, directed graph
 Johnson's algorithm: all pairs shortest path algorithm in sparse weighted directed graph

 Transitive closure problem: find the transitive closure of a given binary relation
 Traveling salesman problem
 Christofides algorithm
 Nearest neighbour algorithm
 Warnsdorff's rule: a heuristic method for solving the Knight's tour problem

Graph search

 A*: special case of best-first search that uses heuristics to improve speed
 B*: a best-first graph search algorithm that finds the least-cost path from a given initial node to any goal node (out of one or more possible goals)
 Backtracking: abandons partial solutions when they are found not to satisfy a complete solution
 Beam search: is a heuristic search algorithm that is an optimization of best-first search that reduces its memory requirement
 Beam stack search: integrates backtracking with beam search
 Best-first search: traverses a graph in the order of likely importance using a priority queue
 Bidirectional search: find the shortest path from an initial vertex to a goal vertex in a directed graph
 Breadth-first search: traverses a graph level by level
 Brute-force search: an exhaustive and reliable search method, but computationally inefficient in many applications
 D*: an incremental heuristic search algorithm
 Depth-first search: traverses a graph branch by branch
 Dijkstra's algorithm: a special case of A* for which no heuristic function is used
 General Problem Solver: a seminal theorem-proving algorithm intended to work as a universal problem solver machine.
 Iterative deepening depth-first search (IDDFS): a state space search strategy
 Jump point search: an optimization to A* which may reduce computation time by an order of magnitude using further heuristics
 Lexicographic breadth-first search (also known as Lex-BFS): a linear time algorithm for ordering the vertices of a graph
 Uniform-cost search: a tree search that finds the lowest-cost route where costs vary
 SSS*: state space search traversing a game tree in a best-first fashion similar to that of the A* search algorithm
 F*: special algorithm to merge the two arrays

Subgraphs
 Cliques
 Bron–Kerbosch algorithm: a technique for finding maximal cliques in an undirected graph
 MaxCliqueDyn maximum clique algorithm: find a maximum clique in an undirected graph
 Strongly connected components
 Path-based strong component algorithm
 Kosaraju's algorithm
 Tarjan's strongly connected components algorithm
 Subgraph isomorphism problem

Sequence algorithms

Approximate sequence matching
 Bitap algorithm: fuzzy algorithm that determines if strings are approximately equal.
 Phonetic algorithms
 Daitch–Mokotoff Soundex: a Soundex refinement which allows matching of Slavic and Germanic surnames
 Double Metaphone: an improvement on Metaphone
 Match rating approach: a phonetic algorithm developed by Western Airlines
 Metaphone: an algorithm for indexing words by their sound, when pronounced in English
 NYSIIS: phonetic algorithm, improves on Soundex
 Soundex: a phonetic algorithm for indexing names by sound, as pronounced in English
 String metrics: computes a similarity or dissimilarity (distance) score between two pairs of text strings
 Damerau–Levenshtein distance: computes a distance measure between two strings, improves on Levenshtein distance
 Dice's coefficient (also known as the Dice coefficient): a similarity measure related to the Jaccard index
 Hamming distance: sum number of positions which are different
 Jaro–Winkler distance: is a measure of similarity between two strings
 Levenshtein edit distance: computes a metric for the amount of difference between two sequences
 Trigram search: search for text when the exact syntax or spelling of the target object is not precisely known

Selection algorithms

 Quickselect
 Introselect

Sequence search
 Linear search: locates an item in an unsorted sequence
 Selection algorithm: finds the kth largest item in a sequence
 Ternary search: a technique for finding the minimum or maximum of a function that is either strictly increasing and then strictly decreasing or vice versa
 Sorted lists
 Binary search algorithm: locates an item in a sorted sequence
 Fibonacci search technique: search a sorted sequence using a divide and conquer algorithm that narrows down possible locations with the aid of Fibonacci numbers
 Jump search (or block search): linear search on a smaller subset of the sequence
 Predictive search: binary-like search which factors in magnitude of search term versus the high and low values in the search.  Sometimes called dictionary search or interpolated search.
 Uniform binary search: an optimization of the classic binary search algorithm

Sequence merging

 Simple merge algorithm
 k-way merge algorithm
 Union (merge, with elements on the output not repeated)

Sequence permutations

 Fisher–Yates shuffle (also known as the Knuth shuffle): randomly shuffle a finite set
 Schensted algorithm: constructs a pair of Young tableaux from a permutation
 Steinhaus–Johnson–Trotter algorithm (also known as the Johnson–Trotter algorithm): generates permutations by transposing elements
 Heap's permutation generation algorithm: interchange elements to generate next permutation

Sequence combinations

Sequence alignment
 Dynamic time warping: measure similarity between two sequences which may vary in time or speed
 Hirschberg's algorithm: finds the least cost sequence alignment between two sequences, as measured by their Levenshtein distance
 Needleman–Wunsch algorithm: find global alignment between two sequences
 Smith–Waterman algorithm: find local sequence alignment

Sequence sorting

 Exchange sorts
 Bubble sort: for each pair of indices, swap the items if out of order
 Cocktail shaker sort or bidirectional bubble sort, a bubble sort traversing the list alternately from front to back and back to front
 Comb sort
 Gnome sort
 Odd–even sort
 Quicksort: divide list into two, with all items on the first list coming before all items on the second list.; then sort the two lists. Often the method of choice
 Humorous or ineffective
 Bogosort
 Stooge sort
 Hybrid
 Flashsort
 Introsort: begin with quicksort and switch to heapsort when the recursion depth exceeds a certain level
 Timsort: adaptative algorithm derived from merge sort and insertion sort. Used in Python 2.3 and up, and Java SE 7.
 Insertion sorts
 Insertion sort: determine where the current item belongs in the list of sorted ones, and insert it there
 Library sort
 Patience sorting
 Shell sort: an attempt to improve insertion sort
 Tree sort (binary tree sort): build binary tree, then traverse it to create sorted list
 Cycle sort: in-place with theoretically optimal number of writes
 Merge sorts
 Merge sort: sort the first and second half of the list separately, then merge the sorted lists
 Slowsort
 Strand sort
 Non-comparison sorts
 Bead sort
 Bucket sort
 Burstsort: build a compact, cache efficient burst trie and then traverse it to create sorted output
 Counting sort
 Pigeonhole sort
 Postman sort: variant of Bucket sort which takes advantage of hierarchical structure
 Radix sort: sorts strings letter by letter
 Selection sorts
 Heapsort: convert the list into a heap, keep removing the largest element from the heap and adding it to the end of the list
 Selection sort: pick the smallest of the remaining elements, add it to the end of the sorted list
 Smoothsort
 Other
 Bitonic sorter
 Pancake sorting
 Spaghetti sort
 Topological sort
 Unknown class
 Samplesort

Subsequences

 Longest common subsequence problem: Find the longest subsequence common to all sequences in a set of sequences
 Longest increasing subsequence problem: Find the longest increasing subsequence of a given sequence
 Ruzzo–Tompa algorithm: Find all non-overlapping, contiguous, maximal scoring subsequences in a sequence of real numbers
 Shortest common supersequence problem: Find the shortest supersequence that contains two or more sequences as subsequences

Substrings

 Kadane's algorithm: finds the contiguous subarray with largest sum in an array of numbers
 Longest common substring problem: find the longest string (or strings) that is a substring (or are substrings) of two or more strings
 Substring search
 Aho–Corasick string matching algorithm: trie based algorithm for finding all substring matches to any of a finite set of strings
 Boyer–Moore string-search algorithm: amortized linear (sublinear in most times) algorithm for substring search
 Boyer–Moore–Horspool algorithm: Simplification of Boyer–Moore
 Knuth–Morris–Pratt algorithm: substring search which bypasses reexamination of matched characters
 Rabin–Karp string search algorithm: searches multiple patterns efficiently
 Zhu–Takaoka string matching algorithm: a variant of Boyer–Moore
 Ukkonen's algorithm: a linear-time, online algorithm for constructing suffix trees
 Matching wildcards
 Rich Salz' wildmat: a widely used open-source recursive algorithm
 Krauss matching wildcards algorithm: an open-source non-recursive algorithm

Computational mathematics

Abstract algebra

 Chien search: a recursive algorithm for determining roots of polynomials defined over a finite field
 Schreier–Sims algorithm: computing a base and strong generating set (BSGS) of a permutation group
 Todd–Coxeter algorithm: Procedure for generating cosets.

Computer algebra

 Buchberger's algorithm: finds a Gröbner basis
 Cantor–Zassenhaus algorithm: factor polynomials over finite fields
 Faugère F4 algorithm: finds a Gröbner basis (also mentions the F5 algorithm)
 Gosper's algorithm: find sums of hypergeometric terms that are themselves hypergeometric terms
 Knuth–Bendix completion algorithm: for rewriting rule systems
 Multivariate division algorithm: for polynomials in several indeterminates
 Pollard's kangaroo algorithm (also known as Pollard's lambda algorithm ): an algorithm for solving the discrete logarithm problem
 Polynomial long division: an algorithm for dividing a polynomial by another polynomial of the same or lower degree
 Risch algorithm: an algorithm for the calculus operation of indefinite integration (i.e. finding antiderivatives)

Geometry

 Closest pair problem: find the pair of points (from a set of points) with the smallest distance between them
 Collision detection algorithms: check for the collision or intersection of two given solids
 Cone algorithm: identify surface points
 Convex hull algorithms: determining the convex hull of a set of points
 Graham scan
 Quickhull
 Gift wrapping algorithm or Jarvis march
 Chan's algorithm
 Kirkpatrick–Seidel algorithm
 Euclidean distance transform: computes the distance between every point in a grid and a discrete collection of points.
 Geometric hashing: a method for efficiently finding two-dimensional objects represented by discrete points that have undergone an affine transformation
 Gilbert–Johnson–Keerthi distance algorithm: determining the smallest distance between two convex shapes.
 Jump-and-Walk algorithm: an algorithm for point location in triangulations
 Laplacian smoothing: an algorithm to smooth a polygonal mesh
 Line segment intersection: finding whether lines intersect, usually with a sweep line algorithm
 Bentley–Ottmann algorithm
 Shamos–Hoey algorithm
 Minimum bounding box algorithms: find the oriented minimum bounding box enclosing a set of points
 Nearest neighbor search: find the nearest point or points to a query point
 Nesting algorithm: make the most efficient use of material or space
 Point in polygon algorithms: tests whether a given point lies within a given polygon
 Point set registration algorithms: finds the transformation between two point sets to optimally align them.
 Rotating calipers: determine all antipodal pairs of points and vertices on a convex polygon or convex hull.
 Shoelace algorithm: determine the area of a polygon whose vertices are described by ordered pairs in the plane
 Triangulation
 Delaunay triangulation
 Ruppert's algorithm (also known as Delaunay refinement): create quality Delaunay triangulations
 Chew's second algorithm: create quality constrained Delaunay triangulations
 Marching triangles: reconstruct two-dimensional surface geometry from an unstructured point cloud
 Polygon triangulation algorithms: decompose a polygon into a set of triangles
 Voronoi diagrams, geometric dual of Delaunay triangulation
 Bowyer–Watson algorithm: create voronoi diagram in any number of dimensions
 Fortune's Algorithm: create voronoi diagram
 Quasitriangulation

Number theoretic algorithms

 Binary GCD algorithm: Efficient way of calculating GCD.
 Booth's multiplication algorithm
 Chakravala method: a cyclic algorithm to solve indeterminate quadratic equations, including Pell's equation
 Discrete logarithm:
 Baby-step giant-step
 Index calculus algorithm
 Pollard's rho algorithm for logarithms
 Pohlig–Hellman algorithm
 Euclidean algorithm: computes the greatest common divisor
 Extended Euclidean algorithm: also solves the equation ax + by = c
 Integer factorization: breaking an integer into its prime factors
 Congruence of squares
 Dixon's algorithm
 Fermat's factorization method
 General number field sieve
 Lenstra elliptic curve factorization
 Pollard's p − 1 algorithm
 Pollard's rho algorithm
 prime factorization algorithm
 Quadratic sieve
 Shor's algorithm
 Special number field sieve
 Trial division
 Multiplication algorithms: fast multiplication of two numbers
 Karatsuba algorithm
 Schönhage–Strassen algorithm
 Toom–Cook multiplication
 Modular square root: computing square roots modulo a prime number
 Tonelli–Shanks algorithm
 Cipolla's algorithm
 Berlekamp's root finding algorithm
 Odlyzko–Schönhage algorithm: calculates nontrivial zeroes of the Riemann zeta function
 Lenstra–Lenstra–Lovász algorithm (also known as LLL algorithm): find a short, nearly orthogonal lattice basis in polynomial time
 Primality tests: determining whether a given number is prime
 AKS primality test
 Baillie–PSW primality test
 Fermat primality test
 Lucas primality test
 Miller–Rabin primality test
 Sieve of Atkin
 Sieve of Eratosthenes
 Sieve of Sundaram

Numerical algorithms

Differential equation solving

 Euler method
 Backward Euler method
 Trapezoidal rule (differential equations)
 Linear multistep methods
 Runge–Kutta methods
 Euler integration
 Multigrid methods (MG methods), a group of algorithms for solving differential equations using a hierarchy of discretizations
 Partial differential equation:
 Finite difference method
 Crank–Nicolson method for diffusion equations
 Lax–Wendroff for wave equations
 Verlet integration: integrate Newton's equations of motion

Elementary and special functions

 Computation of π:
 Borwein's algorithm: an algorithm to calculate the value of 1/π
 Gauss–Legendre algorithm: computes the digits of pi
 Chudnovsky algorithm: a fast method for calculating the digits of π
 Bailey–Borwein–Plouffe formula: (BBP formula) a spigot algorithm for the computation of the nth binary digit of π
 Division algorithms: for computing quotient and/or remainder of two numbers
 Long division
 Restoring division
 Non-restoring division
 SRT division
 Newton–Raphson division: uses Newton's method to find the reciprocal of D, and multiply that reciprocal by N to find the final quotient Q.
 Goldschmidt division
 Hyperbolic and Trigonometric Functions:
 BKM algorithm: computes elementary functions using a table of logarithms
 CORDIC: computes hyperbolic and trigonometric functions using a table of arctangents
 Exponentiation:
 Addition-chain exponentiation: exponentiation by positive integer powers that requires a minimal number of multiplications
 Exponentiating by squaring: an algorithm used for the fast computation of large integer powers of a number
 Montgomery reduction: an algorithm that allows modular arithmetic to be performed efficiently when the modulus is large
 Multiplication algorithms: fast multiplication of two numbers
 Booth's multiplication algorithm: a multiplication algorithm that multiplies two signed binary numbers in two's complement notation
 Fürer's algorithm: an integer multiplication algorithm for very large numbers possessing a very low asymptotic complexity
 Karatsuba algorithm: an efficient procedure for multiplying large numbers
 Schönhage–Strassen algorithm: an asymptotically fast multiplication algorithm for large integers
 Toom–Cook multiplication: (Toom3) a multiplication algorithm for large integers
 Multiplicative inverse Algorithms: for computing a number's multiplicative inverse (reciprocal).
 Newton's method
 Rounding functions: the classic ways to round numbers
 Spigot algorithm: a way to compute the value of a mathematical constant without knowing preceding digits
 Square and Nth root of a number:
 Alpha max plus beta min algorithm: an approximation of the square-root of the sum of two squares
 Methods of computing square roots
 nth root algorithm
 Shifting nth-root algorithm: digit by digit root extraction
 Summation:
 Binary splitting: a divide and conquer technique which speeds up the numerical evaluation of many types of series with rational terms
 Kahan summation algorithm: a more accurate method of summing floating-point numbers
 Unrestricted algorithm

Geometric
 Filtered back-projection: efficiently computes the inverse 2-dimensional Radon transform.
 Level set method (LSM): a numerical technique for tracking interfaces and shapes

Interpolation and extrapolation

 Birkhoff interpolation: an extension of polynomial interpolation
 Cubic interpolation
 Hermite interpolation
 Lagrange interpolation: interpolation using Lagrange polynomials
 Linear interpolation: a method of curve fitting using linear polynomials
 Monotone cubic interpolation: a variant of cubic interpolation that preserves monotonicity of the data set being interpolated.
 Multivariate interpolation
 Bicubic interpolation, a generalization of cubic interpolation to two dimensions
 Bilinear interpolation: an extension of linear interpolation for interpolating functions of two variables on a regular grid
 Lanczos resampling ("Lanzosh"): a multivariate interpolation method used to compute new values for any digitally sampled data
 Nearest-neighbor interpolation
 Tricubic interpolation, a generalization of cubic interpolation to three dimensions
 Pareto interpolation: a method of estimating the median and other properties of a population that follows a Pareto distribution.
 Polynomial interpolation
 Neville's algorithm
 Spline interpolation: Reduces error with Runge's phenomenon.
 De Boor algorithm: B-splines
 De Casteljau's algorithm: Bézier curves
 Trigonometric interpolation

Linear algebra

 Eigenvalue algorithms
 Arnoldi iteration
 Inverse iteration
 Jacobi method
 Lanczos iteration
 Power iteration
 QR algorithm
 Rayleigh quotient iteration
 Gram–Schmidt process: orthogonalizes a set of vectors
 Matrix multiplication algorithms
 Cannon's algorithm: a distributed algorithm for matrix multiplication especially suitable for computers laid out in an N × N mesh
 Coppersmith–Winograd algorithm: square matrix multiplication
 Freivalds' algorithm: a randomized algorithm used to verify matrix multiplication
 Strassen algorithm: faster matrix multiplication

 Solving systems of linear equations
 Biconjugate gradient method: solves systems of linear equations
 Conjugate gradient: an algorithm for the numerical solution of particular systems of linear equations
 Gaussian elimination
 Gauss–Jordan elimination: solves systems of linear equations
 Gauss–Seidel method: solves systems of linear equations iteratively
 Levinson recursion: solves equation involving a Toeplitz matrix
 Stone's method: also known as the strongly implicit procedure or SIP, is an algorithm for solving a sparse linear system of equations
 Successive over-relaxation (SOR): method used to speed up convergence of the Gauss–Seidel method
 Tridiagonal matrix algorithm (Thomas algorithm): solves systems of tridiagonal equations
 Sparse matrix algorithms
 Cuthill–McKee algorithm: reduce the bandwidth of a symmetric sparse matrix
 Minimum degree algorithm: permute the rows and columns of a symmetric sparse matrix before applying the Cholesky decomposition
 Symbolic Cholesky decomposition: Efficient way of storing sparse matrix

Monte Carlo

 Gibbs sampling: generates a sequence of samples from the joint probability distribution of two or more random variables
 Hybrid Monte Carlo: generates a sequence of samples using Hamiltonian weighted Markov chain Monte Carlo, from a probability distribution which is difficult to sample directly.
 Metropolis–Hastings algorithm: used to generate a sequence of samples from the probability distribution of one or more variables
 Wang and Landau algorithm: an extension of Metropolis–Hastings algorithm sampling

Numerical integration

 MISER algorithm: Monte Carlo simulation, numerical integration

Root finding

 Bisection method
 False position method: approximates roots of a function
 ITP method: minmax optimal and superlinar convergence simultaneously
 Newton's method: finds zeros of functions with calculus
 Halley's method: uses first and second derivatives
 Secant method: 2-point, 1-sided
 False position method and Illinois method: 2-point, bracketing
 Ridder's method: 3-point, exponential scaling
 Muller's method: 3-point, quadratic interpolation

Optimization algorithms

 Alpha–beta pruning: search to reduce number of nodes in minimax algorithm
 Branch and bound
 Bruss algorithm: see odds algorithm
 Chain matrix multiplication
 Combinatorial optimization: optimization problems where the set of feasible solutions is discrete
 Greedy randomized adaptive search procedure (GRASP): successive constructions of a greedy randomized solution and subsequent iterative improvements of it through a local search
 Hungarian method: a combinatorial optimization algorithm which solves the assignment problem in polynomial time
 Constraint satisfaction
 General algorithms for the constraint satisfaction
 AC-3 algorithm
 Difference map algorithm
 Min conflicts algorithm
 Chaff algorithm: an algorithm for solving instances of the boolean satisfiability problem
 Davis–Putnam algorithm: check the validity of a first-order logic formula
 Davis–Putnam–Logemann–Loveland algorithm (DPLL): an algorithm for deciding the satisfiability of propositional logic formula in conjunctive normal form, i.e. for solving the CNF-SAT problem
 Exact cover problem
 Algorithm X: a nondeterministic algorithm
 Dancing Links: an efficient implementation of Algorithm X
 Cross-entropy method: a general Monte Carlo approach to combinatorial and continuous multi-extremal optimization and importance sampling
 Differential evolution
 Dynamic Programming: problems exhibiting the properties of overlapping subproblems and optimal substructure
 Ellipsoid method: is an algorithm for solving convex optimization problems
 Evolutionary computation: optimization inspired by biological mechanisms of evolution
 Evolution strategy
 Gene expression programming
 Genetic algorithms
 Fitness proportionate selection – also known as roulette-wheel selection
 Stochastic universal sampling
 Truncation selection
 Tournament selection
 Memetic algorithm
 Swarm intelligence
 Ant colony optimization
 Bees algorithm: a search algorithm which mimics the food foraging behavior of swarms of honey bees
 Particle swarm
 Frank-Wolfe algorithm: an iterative first-order optimization algorithm for constrained convex optimization
 Golden-section search: an algorithm for finding the maximum of a real function
 Gradient descent
 Grid Search
 Harmony search (HS): a metaheuristic algorithm mimicking the improvisation process of musicians
 Interior point method
 Linear programming
 Benson's algorithm: an algorithm for solving linear vector optimization problems
 Dantzig–Wolfe decomposition: an algorithm for solving linear programming problems with special structure
 Delayed column generation
 Integer linear programming: solve linear programming problems where some or all the unknowns are restricted to integer values
 Branch and cut
 Cutting-plane method
 Karmarkar's algorithm: The first reasonably efficient algorithm that solves the linear programming problem in polynomial time.
 Simplex algorithm: an algorithm for solving linear programming problems
 Line search
 Local search: a metaheuristic for solving computationally hard optimization problems
 Random-restart hill climbing
 Tabu search
 Minimax used in game programming
 Nearest neighbor search (NNS): find closest points in a metric space
 Best Bin First: find an approximate solution to the nearest neighbor search problem in very-high-dimensional spaces
 Newton's method in optimization
 Nonlinear optimization
 BFGS method: a nonlinear optimization algorithm
 Gauss–Newton algorithm: an algorithm for solving nonlinear least squares problems
 Levenberg–Marquardt algorithm: an algorithm for solving nonlinear least squares problems
 Nelder–Mead method (downhill simplex method): a nonlinear optimization algorithm
 Odds algorithm (Bruss algorithm): Finds the optimal strategy to predict a last specific event in a random sequence event
 Random Search
 Simulated annealing
 Stochastic tunneling
 Subset sum algorithm

Computational science

Astronomy
 Doomsday algorithm: day of the week
 Zeller's congruence is an algorithm to calculate the day of the week for any Julian or Gregorian calendar date
 various Easter algorithms are used to calculate the day of Easter

Bioinformatics

 Basic Local Alignment Search Tool also known as BLAST: an algorithm for comparing primary biological sequence information
 Kabsch algorithm: calculate the optimal alignment of two sets of points in order to compute the root mean squared deviation between two protein structures.
 Velvet: a set of algorithms manipulating de Bruijn graphs for genomic sequence assembly
 Sorting by signed reversals: an algorithm for understanding genomic evolution.
 Maximum parsimony (phylogenetics): an algorithm for finding the simplest phylogenetic tree to explain a given character matrix.
 UPGMA: a distance-based phylogenetic tree construction algorithm.

Geoscience

 Vincenty's formulae: a fast algorithm to calculate the distance between two latitude/longitude points on an ellipsoid
 Geohash: a public domain algorithm that encodes a decimal latitude/longitude pair as a hash string

Linguistics

 Lesk algorithm: word sense disambiguation
 Stemming algorithm: a method of reducing words to their stem, base, or root form
 Sukhotin's algorithm: a statistical classification algorithm for classifying characters in a text as vowels or consonants

Medicine

 ESC algorithm for the diagnosis of heart failure
 Manning Criteria for irritable bowel syndrome
 Pulmonary embolism diagnostic algorithms
 Texas Medication Algorithm Project

Physics

 Constraint algorithm: a class of algorithms for satisfying constraints for bodies that obey Newton's equations of motion
 Demon algorithm: a Monte Carlo method for efficiently sampling members of a microcanonical ensemble with a given energy
 Featherstone's algorithm: computes the effects of forces applied to a structure of joints and links
 Ground state approximation
 Variational method
 Ritz method
 n-body problems
 Fast multipole method (FMM): speeds up the calculation of long-ranged forces
 Rainflow-counting algorithm: Reduces a complex stress history to a count of elementary stress-reversals for use in fatigue analysis
 Sweep and prune: a broad phase algorithm used during collision detection to limit the number of pairs of solids that need to be checked for collision
 VEGAS algorithm: a method for reducing error in Monte Carlo simulations
 Glauber dynamics: a method for simulating the Ising Model on a computer

Statistics

 Algorithms for calculating variance: avoiding instability and numerical overflow
 Approximate counting algorithm: allows counting large number of events in a small register
 Bayesian statistics
 Nested sampling algorithm: a computational approach to the problem of comparing models in Bayesian statistics
 Clustering Algorithms
 Average-linkage clustering: a simple agglomerative clustering algorithm
 Canopy clustering algorithm: an unsupervised pre-clustering algorithm related to the K-means algorithm
 Complete-linkage clustering: a simple agglomerative clustering algorithm
 DBSCAN: a density based clustering algorithm
 Expectation-maximization algorithm
 Fuzzy clustering: a class of clustering algorithms where each point has a degree of belonging to clusters
 Fuzzy c-means
 FLAME clustering (Fuzzy clustering by Local Approximation of MEmberships): define clusters in the dense parts of a dataset and perform cluster assignment solely based on the neighborhood relationships among objects
 KHOPCA clustering algorithm: a local clustering algorithm, which produces hierarchical multi-hop clusters in static and mobile environments.
 k-means clustering: cluster objects based on attributes into partitions
 k-means++: a variation of this, using modified random seeds
 k-medoids: similar to k-means, but chooses datapoints or medoids as centers
 Linde–Buzo–Gray algorithm: a vector quantization algorithm to derive a good codebook
 Lloyd's algorithm (Voronoi iteration or relaxation): group data points into a given number of categories, a popular algorithm for k-means clustering
 OPTICS: a density based clustering algorithm with a visual evaluation method
 Single-linkage clustering: a simple agglomerative clustering algorithm
 SUBCLU: a subspace clustering algorithm
 Ward's method: an agglomerative clustering algorithm, extended to more general Lance–Williams algorithms
 WACA clustering algorithm: a local clustering algorithm with potentially multi-hop structures; for dynamic networks
 Estimation Theory
 Expectation-maximization algorithm A class of related algorithms for finding maximum likelihood estimates of parameters in probabilistic models
 Ordered subset expectation maximization (OSEM): used in medical imaging for positron emission tomography, single-photon emission computed tomography and X-ray computed tomography.
 Odds algorithm (Bruss algorithm) Optimal online search for distinguished value in sequential random input
 Kalman filter: estimate the state of a linear dynamic system from a series of noisy measurements
 False nearest neighbor algorithm (FNN) estimates fractal dimension
 Hidden Markov model
 Baum–Welch algorithm: computes maximum likelihood estimates and posterior mode estimates for the parameters of a hidden Markov model
 Forward-backward algorithm: a dynamic programming algorithm for computing the probability of a particular observation sequence
 Viterbi algorithm: find the most likely sequence of hidden states in a hidden Markov model
 Partial least squares regression: finds a linear model describing some predicted variables in terms of other observable variables
 Queuing theory
 Buzen's algorithm: an algorithm for calculating the normalization constant G(K) in the Gordon–Newell theorem
 RANSAC (an abbreviation for "RANdom SAmple Consensus"): an iterative method to estimate parameters of a mathematical model from a set of observed data which contains outliers
 Scoring algorithm: is a form of Newton's method used to solve maximum likelihood equations numerically
 Yamartino method: calculate an approximation to the standard deviation σθ of wind direction θ during a single pass through the incoming data
 Ziggurat algorithm: generates random numbers from a non-uniform distribution

Computer science

Computer architecture

 Tomasulo algorithm: allows sequential instructions that would normally be stalled due to certain dependencies to execute non-sequentially

Computer graphics

 Clipping
 Line clipping
 Cohen–Sutherland
 Cyrus–Beck
 Fast-clipping
 Liang–Barsky
 Nicholl–Lee–Nicholl
 Polygon clipping
 Sutherland–Hodgman
 Vatti
 Weiler–Atherton
 Contour lines and Isosurfaces
 Marching cubes: extract a polygonal mesh of an isosurface from a three-dimensional scalar field (sometimes called voxels)
 Marching squares: generates contour lines for a two-dimensional scalar field
 Marching tetrahedrons: an alternative to Marching cubes
 Discrete Green's Theorem: is an algorithm for computing double integral over a generalized rectangular domain in constant time.  It is a natural extension to the summed area table algorithm
 Flood fill: fills a connected region of a multi-dimensional array with a specified symbol
 Global illumination algorithms: Considers direct illumination and reflection from other objects.
 Ambient occlusion
 Beam tracing
 Cone tracing
 Image-based lighting
 Metropolis light transport
 Path tracing
 Photon mapping
 Radiosity
 Ray tracing
 Hidden-surface removal or Visual surface determination
 Newell's algorithm: eliminate polygon cycles in the depth sorting required in hidden-surface removal
 Painter's algorithm: detects visible parts of a 3-dimensional scenery
 Scanline rendering: constructs an image by moving an imaginary line over the image
 Warnock algorithm
 Line Drawing: graphical algorithm for approximating a line segment on discrete graphical media.
 Bresenham's line algorithm: plots points of a 2-dimensional array to form a straight line between 2 specified points (uses decision variables)
 DDA line algorithm: plots points of a 2-dimensional array to form a straight line between 2 specified points (uses floating-point math)
 Xiaolin Wu's line algorithm: algorithm for line antialiasing.
 Midpoint circle algorithm: an algorithm used to determine the points needed for drawing a circle
 Ramer–Douglas–Peucker algorithm: Given a 'curve' composed of line segments to find a curve not too dissimilar but that has fewer points
 Shading
 Gouraud shading: an algorithm to simulate the differing effects of light and colour across the surface of an object in 3D computer graphics
 Phong shading: an algorithm to interpolate surface normal-vectors for surface shading in 3D computer graphics
 Slerp (spherical linear interpolation): quaternion interpolation for the purpose of animating 3D rotation
 Summed area table (also known as an integral image): an algorithm for computing the sum of values in a rectangular subset of a grid in constant time

Cryptography

 Asymmetric (public key) encryption:
 ElGamal
 Elliptic curve cryptography
 MAE1
 NTRUEncrypt
 RSA
 Digital signatures (asymmetric authentication):
 DSA, and its variants:
 ECDSA and Deterministic ECDSA
 EdDSA (Ed25519)
 RSA
 Cryptographic hash functions (see also the section on message authentication codes):
 BLAKE
 MD5 – Note that there is now a method of generating collisions for MD5
 RIPEMD-160
 SHA-1 – Note that there is now a method of generating collisions for SHA-1
 SHA-2 (SHA-224, SHA-256, SHA-384, SHA-512)
 SHA-3 (SHA3-224, SHA3-256, SHA3-384, SHA3-512, SHAKE128, SHAKE256)
 Tiger (TTH), usually used in Tiger tree hashes
 WHIRLPOOL
 Cryptographically secure pseudo-random number generators
 Blum Blum Shub – based on the hardness of factorization
 Fortuna, intended as an improvement on Yarrow algorithm
 Linear-feedback shift register (note: many LFSR-based algorithms are weak or have been broken)
 Yarrow algorithm
 Key exchange
 Diffie–Hellman key exchange
 Elliptic-curve Diffie–Hellman (ECDH)
 Key derivation functions, often used for password hashing and key stretching
 bcrypt
 PBKDF2
 scrypt
 Argon2
 Message authentication codes (symmetric authentication algorithms, which take a key as a parameter):
 HMAC: keyed-hash message authentication
 Poly1305
 SipHash
 Secret sharing, Secret Splitting, Key Splitting, M of N algorithms
 Blakey's Scheme
 Shamir's Scheme
 Symmetric (secret key) encryption:
 Advanced Encryption Standard (AES), winner of NIST competition, also known as Rijndael
 Blowfish
 Twofish
 Threefish
 Data Encryption Standard (DES), sometimes DE Algorithm, winner of NBS selection competition, replaced by AES for most purposes
 IDEA
 RC4 (cipher)
 Tiny Encryption Algorithm (TEA)
 Salsa20, and its updated variant ChaCha20
 Post-quantum cryptography
 Proof-of-work algorithms

Digital logic
 Boolean minimization
 Quine–McCluskey algorithm: also called as Q-M algorithm, programmable method for simplifying the boolean equations
 Petrick's method: another algorithm for boolean simplification
 Espresso heuristic logic minimizer: a fast algorithm for boolean function minimization

Machine learning and statistical classification

 ALOPEX: a correlation-based machine-learning algorithm
 Association rule learning: discover interesting relations between variables, used in data mining
 Apriori algorithm
 Eclat algorithm
 FP-growth algorithm
 One-attribute rule
 Zero-attribute rule
 Boosting (meta-algorithm): Use many weak learners to boost effectiveness
 AdaBoost: adaptive boosting
 BrownBoost: a boosting algorithm that may be robust to noisy datasets
 LogitBoost: logistic regression boosting
 LPBoost: linear programming boosting
 Bootstrap aggregating (bagging): technique to improve stability and classification accuracy
 Computer Vision
 Grabcut based on Graph cuts
 Decision Trees
 C4.5 algorithm: an extension to ID3
 ID3 algorithm (Iterative Dichotomiser 3): use heuristic to generate small decision trees
 Clustering: a class of unsupervised learning algorithms for grouping and bucketing related input vector.
 k-nearest neighbors (k-NN): a method for classifying objects based on closest training examples in the feature space
 Linde–Buzo–Gray algorithm: a vector quantization algorithm used to derive a good codebook
 Locality-sensitive hashing (LSH): a method of performing probabilistic dimension reduction of high-dimensional data
 Neural Network
 Backpropagation: a supervised learning method which requires a teacher that knows, or can calculate, the desired output for any given input
 Hopfield net: a Recurrent neural network in which all connections are symmetric
 Perceptron: the simplest kind of feedforward neural network: a linear classifier.
 Pulse-coupled neural networks (PCNN): Neural models proposed by modeling a cat's visual cortex and developed for high-performance biomimetic image processing.
 Radial basis function network: an artificial neural network that uses radial basis functions as activation functions
 Self-organizing map: an unsupervised network that produces a low-dimensional representation of the input space of the training samples
 Random forest: classify using many decision trees
 Reinforcement learning:
 Q-learning: learns an action-value function that gives the expected utility of taking a given action in a given state and following a fixed policy thereafter
 State–Action–Reward–State–Action (SARSA): learn a Markov decision process policy
 Temporal difference learning
 Relevance-Vector Machine (RVM): similar to SVM, but provides probabilistic classification
 Supervised learning: Learning by examples (labelled data-set split into training-set and test-set)
 Support Vector Machine (SVM): a set of methods which divide multidimensional data by finding a dividing hyperplane with the maximum margin between the two sets
 Structured SVM: allows training of a classifier for general structured output labels.
 Winnow algorithm: related to the perceptron, but uses a multiplicative weight-update scheme

Programming language theory

 C3 linearization: an algorithm used primarily to obtain a consistent linearization of a multiple inheritance hierarchy in object-oriented programming
 Chaitin's algorithm: a bottom-up, graph coloring register allocation algorithm that uses cost/degree as its spill metric
 Hindley–Milner type inference algorithm
 Rete algorithm: an efficient pattern matching algorithm for implementing production rule systems
 Sethi-Ullman algorithm: generates optimal code for arithmetic expressions

Parsing

 CYK algorithm: an O(n3) algorithm for parsing context-free grammars in Chomsky normal form
 Earley parser: another O(n3) algorithm for parsing any context-free grammar
 GLR parser: an algorithm for parsing any context-free grammar by Masaru Tomita. It is tuned for deterministic grammars, on which it performs almost linear time and O(n3) in worst case.
 Inside-outside algorithm: an O(n3) algorithm for re-estimating production probabilities in probabilistic context-free grammars
 LL parser: a relatively simple linear time parsing algorithm for a limited class of context-free grammars
 LR parser: A more complex linear time parsing algorithm for a larger class of context-free grammars.  Variants:
 Canonical LR parser
 LALR (look-ahead LR) parser
 Operator-precedence parser
 SLR (Simple LR) parser
 Simple precedence parser
 Packrat parser: a linear time parsing algorithm supporting some context-free grammars and parsing expression grammars
 Recursive descent parser: a top-down parser suitable for LL(k) grammars
 Shunting-yard algorithm: converts an infix-notation math expression to postfix
 Pratt parser
 Lexical analysis

Quantum algorithms

 Deutsch–Jozsa algorithm: criterion of balance for Boolean function
 Grover's algorithm: provides quadratic speedup for many search problems
 Shor's algorithm: provides exponential speedup (relative to currently known non-quantum algorithms) for factoring a number
 Simon's algorithm: provides a provably exponential speedup (relative to any non-quantum algorithm) for a black-box problem

Theory of computation and automata

 Hopcroft's algorithm, Moore's algorithm, and Brzozowski's algorithm: algorithms for minimizing the number of states in a deterministic finite automaton
 Powerset construction: algorithm to convert nondeterministic automaton to deterministic automaton.
 Tarski–Kuratowski algorithm: a non-deterministic algorithm which provides an upper bound for the complexity of formulas in the arithmetical hierarchy and analytical hierarchy

Information theory and signal processing

Coding theory

Error detection and correction

 BCH Codes
 Berlekamp–Massey algorithm
 Peterson–Gorenstein–Zierler algorithm
 Reed–Solomon error correction
 BCJR algorithm: decoding of error correcting codes defined on trellises (principally convolutional codes)
 Forward error correction
 Gray code
 Hamming codes
 Hamming(7,4): a Hamming code that encodes 4 bits of data into 7 bits by adding 3 parity bits
 Hamming distance: sum number of positions which are different
 Hamming weight (population count): find the number of 1 bits in a binary word
 Redundancy checks
 Adler-32
 Cyclic redundancy check
 Damm algorithm
 Fletcher's checksum
 Longitudinal redundancy check (LRC)
 Luhn algorithm: a method of validating identification numbers
 Luhn mod N algorithm: extension of Luhn to non-numeric characters
 Parity: simple/fast error detection technique
 Verhoeff algorithm

Lossless compression algorithms

 Burrows–Wheeler transform: preprocessing useful for improving lossless compression
 Context tree weighting
 Delta encoding: aid to compression of data in which sequential data occurs frequently
 Dynamic Markov compression: Compression using predictive arithmetic coding
 Dictionary coders
 Byte pair encoding (BPE)
 Deflate
 Lempel–Ziv
 LZ77 and LZ78
 Lempel–Ziv Jeff Bonwick (LZJB)
 Lempel–Ziv–Markov chain algorithm (LZMA)
 Lempel–Ziv–Oberhumer (LZO): speed oriented
 Lempel–Ziv–Stac (LZS)
 Lempel–Ziv–Storer–Szymanski (LZSS)
 Lempel–Ziv–Welch (LZW)
 LZWL: syllable-based variant
 LZX
 Lempel–Ziv Ross Williams (LZRW)
 Entropy encoding: coding scheme that assigns codes to symbols so as to match code lengths with the probabilities of the symbols
 Arithmetic coding: advanced entropy coding
 Range encoding: same as arithmetic coding, but looked at in a slightly different way
 Huffman coding: simple lossless compression taking advantage of relative character frequencies
 Adaptive Huffman coding: adaptive coding technique based on Huffman coding
 Package-merge algorithm: Optimizes Huffman coding subject to a length restriction on code strings
 Shannon–Fano coding
 Shannon–Fano–Elias coding: precursor to arithmetic encoding
 Entropy coding with known entropy characteristics
 Golomb coding: form of entropy coding that is optimal for alphabets following geometric distributions
 Rice coding: form of entropy coding that is optimal for alphabets following geometric distributions
 Truncated binary encoding
 Unary coding: code that represents a number n with n ones followed by a zero
 Universal codes: encodes positive integers into binary code words
 Elias delta, gamma, and omega coding
 Exponential-Golomb coding
 Fibonacci coding
 Levenshtein coding
 Fast Efficient & Lossless Image Compression System (FELICS): a lossless image compression algorithm
 Incremental encoding: delta encoding applied to sequences of strings
 Prediction by partial matching (PPM): an adaptive statistical data compression technique based on context modeling and prediction
 Run-length encoding: lossless data compression taking advantage of strings of repeated characters
 SEQUITUR algorithm: lossless compression by incremental grammar inference on a string

Lossy compression algorithms

 3Dc: a lossy data compression algorithm for normal maps
 Audio and Speech compression
 A-law algorithm: standard companding algorithm
 Code-excited linear prediction (CELP): low bit-rate speech compression
 Linear predictive coding (LPC): lossy compression by representing the spectral envelope of a digital signal of speech in compressed form
 Mu-law algorithm: standard analog signal compression or companding algorithm
 Warped Linear Predictive Coding (WLPC)
 Image compression
 Block Truncation Coding (BTC): a type of lossy image compression technique for greyscale images
 Embedded Zerotree Wavelet (EZW)
 Fast Cosine Transform algorithms (FCT algorithms): computes Discrete Cosine Transform (DCT) efficiently
 Fractal compression: method used to compress images using fractals
 Set Partitioning in Hierarchical Trees (SPIHT)
 Wavelet compression: form of data compression well suited for image compression (sometimes also video compression and audio compression)
 Transform coding: type of data compression for "natural" data like audio signals or photographic images
 Video compression
 Vector quantization: technique often used in lossy data compression

Digital signal processing

 Adaptive-additive algorithm (AA algorithm): find the spatial frequency phase of an observed wave source
 Discrete Fourier transform: determines the frequencies contained in a (segment of a) signal
 Bluestein's FFT algorithm
 Bruun's FFT algorithm
 Cooley–Tukey FFT algorithm
 Fast Fourier transform
 Prime-factor FFT algorithm
 Rader's FFT algorithm
 Fast folding algorithm: an efficient algorithm for the detection of approximately periodic events within time series data
 Gerchberg–Saxton algorithm: Phase retrieval algorithm for optical planes
 Goertzel algorithm: identify a particular frequency component in a signal.  Can be used for DTMF digit decoding.
 Karplus-Strong string synthesis: physical modelling synthesis to simulate the sound of a hammered or plucked string or some types of percussion

Image processing

 Contrast Enhancement
 Histogram equalization: use histogram to improve image contrast
 Adaptive histogram equalization: histogram equalization which adapts to local changes in contrast
 Connected-component labeling: find and label disjoint regions
 Dithering and half-toning
 Error diffusion
 Floyd–Steinberg dithering
 Ordered dithering
 Riemersma dithering
 Elser difference-map algorithm: a search algorithm for general constraint satisfaction problems.  Originally used for X-Ray diffraction microscopy
 Feature detection
 Canny edge detector: detect a wide range of edges in images
 Generalised Hough transform
 Hough transform
 Marr–Hildreth algorithm: an early edge detection algorithm
 SIFT (Scale-invariant feature transform): is an algorithm to detect and describe local features in images.
 : is a robust local feature detector, first presented by Herbert Bay et al. in 2006, that can be used in computer vision tasks like object recognition or 3D reconstruction. It is partly inspired by the SIFT descriptor. The standard version of SURF is several times faster than SIFT and claimed by its authors to be more robust against different image transformations than SIFT.
 Richardson–Lucy deconvolution: image de-blurring algorithm
 Blind deconvolution: image de-blurring algorithm when point spread function is unknown.
 Median filtering
 Seam carving: content-aware image resizing algorithm
 Segmentation: partition a digital image into two or more regions
 GrowCut algorithm: an interactive segmentation algorithm
 Random walker algorithm
 Region growing
 Watershed transformation: a class of algorithms based on the watershed analogy

Software engineering

 Cache algorithms
 CHS conversion: converting between disk addressing systems
 Double dabble: Convert binary numbers to BCD
 Hash Function: convert a large, possibly variable-sized amount of data into a small datum, usually a single integer that may serve as an index into an array
 Fowler–Noll–Vo hash function: fast with low collision rate
 Pearson hashing: computes 8 bit value only, optimized for 8 bit computers
 Zobrist hashing: used in the implementation of transposition tables
 Unicode Collation Algorithm
 Xor swap algorithm: swaps the values of two variables without using a buffer

Database algorithms

 Algorithms for Recovery and Isolation Exploiting Semantics (ARIES): transaction recovery
 Join algorithms
 Block nested loop
 Hash join
 Nested loop join
 Sort-Merge Join

Distributed systems algorithms

 Clock synchronization
 Berkeley algorithm
 Cristian's algorithm
 Intersection algorithm
 Marzullo's algorithm
 Consensus (computer science): agreeing on a single value or history among unreliable processors
 Chandra–Toueg consensus algorithm
 Paxos algorithm
 Raft (computer science)
 Detection of Process Termination
 Dijkstra-Scholten algorithm
 Huang's algorithm
 Lamport ordering: a partial ordering of events based on the happened-before relation
 Leader election: a method for dynamically selecting a coordinator
 Bully algorithm
 Mutual exclusion
 Lamport's Distributed Mutual Exclusion Algorithm
 Naimi-Trehel's log(n) Algorithm
 Maekawa's Algorithm
 Raymond's Algorithm
 Ricart–Agrawala Algorithm
 Snapshot algorithm: record a consistent global state for an asynchronous system
 Chandy–Lamport algorithm
 Vector clocks: generate a partial ordering of events in a distributed system and detect causality violations

Memory allocation and deallocation algorithms
 Buddy memory allocation: an algorithm to allocate memory such with less fragmentation
 Garbage collectors
 Cheney's algorithm: an improvement on the Semi-space collector
 Generational garbage collector: Fast garbage collectors that segregate memory by age
 Mark-compact algorithm: a combination of the mark-sweep algorithm and Cheney's copying algorithm
 Mark and sweep
 Semi-space collector: an early copying collector
 Reference counting

Networking

 Karn's algorithm: addresses the problem of getting accurate estimates of the round-trip time for messages when using TCP
 Luleå algorithm: a technique for storing and searching internet routing tables efficiently
 Network congestion
 Exponential backoff
 Nagle's algorithm: improve the efficiency of TCP/IP networks by coalescing packets
 Truncated binary exponential backoff

Operating systems algorithms

 Banker's algorithm: algorithm used for deadlock avoidance
 Page replacement algorithms: for selecting the victim page under low memory conditions
 Adaptive replacement cache: better performance than LRU
 Clock with Adaptive Replacement (CAR): a page replacement algorithm with performance comparable to adaptive replacement cache

Process synchronization

 Dekker's algorithm
 Lamport's Bakery algorithm
 Peterson's algorithm

Scheduling

 Earliest deadline first scheduling
 Fair-share scheduling
 Least slack time scheduling
 List scheduling
 Multi level feedback queue
 Rate-monotonic scheduling
 Round-robin scheduling
 Shortest job next
 Shortest remaining time
 Top-nodes algorithm: resource calendar management

I/O scheduling

Disk scheduling
 Elevator algorithm: Disk scheduling algorithm that works like an elevator.
 Shortest seek first: Disk scheduling algorithm to reduce seek time.

Other
'For You' algorithm: a proprietary algorithm developed by the social media network Tik-Tok. Uploaded videos are released first to a selection of users who have been identified by the algorithm as being likely to engage with the video, based on their previous web-site viewing patterns.

See also
 List of data structures
 List of machine learning algorithms
 List of pathfinding algorithms
 List of algorithm general topics
 List of terms relating to algorithms and data structures
 Heuristic

References

Algorithms